= Crimson Sun =

Finnish heavy metal band

Crimson Sun is a Finnish melodic heavy metal band.

Following demos and an EP, the band released their first album Towards the Light on Maple Metal Records in 2015.

== Discography ==
- Tales Unseen (demo, 2006)
- Towards the Light (2015)
- Fates (2020)
- Sorrowbreaker (2024)
